Deraz Ab (also Romanized as Derāz Āb and Darāz Ab; also known as Āb Derāz, Darzāb, and Şaḩrā-ye Derāz Āb) is a village in Pol Khatun Rural District, Marzdaran District, Sarakhs County, Razavi Khorasan Province, Iran. At the 2006 census, its population was 225, in 44 families.

References 

Populated places in Sarakhs County